Shageluk Airport  is a state-owned public-use airport located one nautical mile (1.85 km) north of the central business district of Shageluk, a city in the Yukon-Koyukuk Census Area of the U.S. state of Alaska.

Facilities 
It has one runway designated 16/34 with a gravel surface measuring 3,400 by 50 feet (1,036 x 15 m) (expanded from the prior size of 2,200 by 35 feet). It also has a seaplane landing area on the Innoko River designated 18W/36W which measures 5,000 by 1,000 feet.

Airlines and destinations

References

External links 
 FAA Alaska airport diagram (GIF)
 

Airports in the Yukon–Koyukuk Census Area, Alaska